The 1966 Tennessee A&I Tigers football team was an American football team that represented Tennessee Agricultural & Industrial State College as a member of the Midwest Athletic Association (MAA) during the 1966 NCAA College Division football season. In their fourth season under head coach John Merritt, the Tigers compiled a perfect 10–0 record, won the MAA championship, shut out five of ten opponents, defeated  in the 1966 Grantland Rice Bowl, and outscored all opponents by a total of 410 to 51. The Tigers compiled a 24-game unbeaten streak that encompassed the 1965 and 1966 seasons.

The team was also recognized as the 1966 black college national champion and was ranked No. 2 in the final 1966 NCAA College Division football rankings issued by the Associated Press and No. 3 in the final poll issued by the United Press International. The team's No. 2 ranking was the highest achieved by a black college team to that point in time. The Pittsburgh Courier called the 1966 Tennessee A&I team as "the finest force yet produced by Negro college football."

Three Tennessee A&I players were selected as first team players on the Pittsburgh Courier's 1966 All-America team: quarterback Eldridge Dickey, fullback Bill Tucker, and defensive tackle Claude Humphrey. Other key players included  halfback Noland Smith and split end Johnnie Robinson.

Schedule

References

Tennessee AandI
Tennessee State Tigers football seasons
Black college football national champions
College football undefeated seasons
Tennessee AandI Tigers